Commitment (lit. "Alumnus" or "The Graduate") is a 2013 South Korean action drama film starring Choi Seung-hyun. He plays the teenage son of an ex-North Korean agent who is tasked to kill a North Korean assassin in South Korea in order to save his younger sister played by Kim Yoo-jung.

The film is about third generation Koreans since the division of the peninsula and the Korean War, historical events that the teenage characters did not directly experience, but nevertheless, change their lives and destinies.

Plot
Nineteen-year-old Li Myung-hoon (Choi Seung-hyun) never imagined he would become a killer. Born to a privileged life in North Korea, his dream was to become a pianist. But when his father, a North Korean spy, dies disgraced, Myung-hoon and his younger sister Hye-in (Kim Yoo-jung) are sent to a "guilt-by-association" forced labor camp. Their father's superior, high-ranking military official Colonel Moon (Jo Sung-ha) proposes a deal to Myung-hoon: if he goes down to the South as a "technician" (an assassin) and finishes what his father had failed to accomplish, he and his sister will be released from the prison camp. Myung-hoon accepts the deal and undergoes two years of intense training.

Myung-hoon finally arrives in South Korea under the guise of a North Korean defector. He is adopted by a South Korean couple who are actually North Korean spies and enrolls at a local high school. He gradually befriends Hye-in (Han Ye-ri), a bullied schoolgirl who shares the same name as his sister and has aspirations of becoming a professional dancer. Myung-hoon then receives his mission: in order to rescue his sister and go back home to the North, he must locate and take out "Big Dipper" (Jung Ho-bin), a North Korean agent working for the opposing government faction. Meanwhile, a power struggle ensues in North Korea with the failing health of dictator Kim Jong-il, and Myung-hoon quickly becomes a liability and must ultimately cope with Colonel Moon's treachery.

Cast
 Choi Seung-hyun – Li Myung-hoon / Kang Dae-ho (cover identity used in South Korea)  
 Han Ye-ri – Lee Hye-in
 Yoon Je-moon – Cha Jung-min, South Korean National Intelligence Service agent
 Jo Sung-ha – Moon Sang-chul, North Korean senior colonel
 Kim Yoo-jung – Li Hye-in, Myung-hoon's younger sister
 Jung Ho-bin – "Big Dipper," North Korean agent
 Kwak Min-seok – North Korean agent, Myung-hoon's adoptive father in South Korea
 Kim Sun-kyung – North Korean agent, Myung-hoon's adoptive mother in South Korea; cover identity as pharmacist
 Dong Hyun-bae – one of the bullies 
 Kim Min-jae – North Korean agent
 Lee Joo-shil – North Korean agent
 Park Ji-il – South Korean agent
 Kang Bit
 Park Sung-woong – Li Young-ho
Myung-hoon and Hye-in's father
 Dong Hyun-bae - as the troubled kid's friend
 Yoo Jae-myung - Kim Sun-myung
Head of Recon Bureau Unit 8. "Defected" in 1992.

Release
The film was released in South Korea on November 6, 2013, opening at number 2 in the box office. On its opening weekend, it sold 689,600 tickets, grossing . In total, Commitment grossed  with 1,048,254 tickets sold nationwide.

Following its pre-sales deal to seven Asian countries (Japan, Singapore, Thailand, Vietnam, Taiwan, Hong Kong, Malaysia and Indonesia), distribution company Well Go USA acquired the North American rights to the film and gave it a limited theatrical release on December 6, 2013. Commitment played in a total of 22 theaters and grossed  on its opening weekend. In total, the film grossed  during its North American run.

European distributor Splendid Film also released Commitment as Silent Assassin in German-speaking territories in 2014.

References

External links
  
 
 
 

2013 action drama films
South Korean action drama films
2013 films
South Korean spy films
Films about North Korea–South Korea relations
2010s South Korean films